Crataegus orientalis, known as oriental hawthorn, is a species of hawthorn native to the Mediterranean region, Turkey, Caucasia, Crimea, and western Iran, with fruits that are orange or various shades of red.

This species is highly variable. Knud Ib Christensen in his monograph divides it into four subspecies:
 C. orientalis subsp. orientalis
 C. orientalis subsp. pojarkovae (Kossych) Byatt has orange fruit.
 C. orientalis subsp. presliana K.I.Chr.
 C. orientalis subsp. szovitsii (Pojarkova) K.I.Chr.

Uses

Culinary uses 
In Caucasia the fruits are either eaten raw or used to make a type of sweet bread.

See also 
 List of hawthorn species with yellow fruit
 Medicinal use of various Crataegus species

References

orientalis